Oil reserves in Canada were estimated at  as of the start of 2015
.  This figure includes the oil sands reserves that are estimated by government regulators to be economically producible at current prices using current technology.  According to this figure, Canada's reserves are third only to Venezuela and Saudi Arabia.  Over 95% of these reserves are in the oil sands deposits in the province of Alberta. Alberta contains nearly all of Canada's oil sands and much of its conventional oil reserves.  The balance is concentrated in several other provinces and territories.  Saskatchewan and offshore areas of Newfoundland in particular have substantial oil production and reserves. Alberta has 39% of Canada's remaining conventional oil reserves, offshore Newfoundland 28% and Saskatchewan 27%, but if oil sands are included, Alberta's share is over 98%.

Status

Canada has a highly sophisticated energy industry and is both an importer and exporter of oil and refined products. Over 99% of Canadian oil exports are sent to the United States, and Canada is the United States' largest supplier of oil.

The decision  of accounting  of the Alberta oil sands deposits as proven reserves was made by the Energy Resources Conservation Board (ERCB), now known as the Alberta Energy and Utilities Board (AEUB). Although now widely accepted, this addition was controversial at the time because oil sands contain an extremely heavy form of crude oil known as bitumen which will not flow toward a well under reservoir conditions. Instead, it must be mined, heated, or diluted with solvents to allow it to be produced, and must be upgraded to lighter oil to be usable by refineries. Historically known as bituminous sands or sometimes as "tar sands", the deposits were exposed as major rivers cut through the oil-bearing formations to reveal the bitumen in the river banks.

Analysts estimate that a price of $30 to $40 per barrel is required to make new oil sands production profitable. In recent years prices have greatly exceeded those levels and the Alberta government expects $116 billion worth of new oil sands projects to be undertaken between 2008 and 2017. However the biggest constraint on oil sands development is a serious labor and housing shortage in Alberta as a whole and the oil sands centre of Fort McMurray in particular. According to Statistics Canada, by September, 2006 unemployment rates in Alberta had fallen to record low levels and per-capita incomes had risen to double the Canadian average. Another hurdle has been Canada's capacity to rapidly increase its export pipelines.  The National Energy Board indicated that exporters faced pipeline apportionment in 2007.  However, surging crude oil prices sparked a jump in applications for oil pipelines in 2007, and new pipelines were planned to carry Canadian oil as far south as U.S. refineries on the Gulf of Mexico.

Up until 2010 Canada was the only major oil producer in the Organization for Economic Co-operation and Development (OECD) to have an increase in oil production in recent years. Production in the other major OECD producers (the United States, United Kingdom, Norway and Mexico) at that time have been declining, as was conventional oil production in Canada. Total crude oil production in Canada was projected to increase by an average of 8.6 percent per year from 2008 to 2011 as a result of new non-conventional oil projects.

See also
 Athabasca Oil Sands
 History of the petroleum industry in Canada (oil sands and heavy oil)

External links 
 Map of Canadian Oil and gas infrastructure

References

Petroleum industry in Canada
Economic history of Canada
Oil companies of Canada
History of Alberta
Energy in Canada
Oil fields of Alberta
Bituminous sands of Canada
Canada
Geology of Canada